A grave candle, grave lantern, death candle or a death lantern is a type of candle or lantern, which is lit in memory of the dead or to commemorate solemn events. The form of a lantern is commonly used in Christianity, whereas candles are more common in Judaism (where they are known as the Yahrzeit candle).

The tradition has been adopted by Christianity from the earlier pagan tradition.

The grave lanterns, known as znicz, are a common tradition in Poland.

See also
Candlelight vigil
Lychnapsia
Votive candle

References

External links
Ljusen på gravarna och andra ljusseder : nya traditioner under 1900-talet 

Candles
Christianity and death
Death customs
Light fixtures